Enrique Mari Bacay Gil V (born March 30, 1992) is a Filipino actor, dancer, and commercial model. Gil has appeared in various films and television shows such as Mula Sa Puso, Budoy, Princess and I, Muling Buksan Ang Puso and She's the One. He is best known for his role as Alexander "Xander" Grande III in the television series Forevermore in 2014–15, alongside Liza Soberano. Since then, he has starred in the films Just The Way You Are (2015), Everyday I Love You (2015), Dukot (2016), My Ex and Whys (2017), Seven Sundays (2017), and Alone/Together (2019); and the television series Dolce Amore (2016), Bagani (2018), and Make It With You (2020).

Early life
Enrique Mari Bacay Gil V was born on March 30, 1992, in Cebu City, Philippines. He is the second son of Enrique Amadeo Gil III and Barbara Anne Bacay. His father is Filipino of Spanish descent, while his mother is Filipino with Spanish, German, and Swiss ancestry. He has an older brother named Enrique Javier (Javy) and a younger sister named Diandra Frances (Andie). His parents used to work as crew for Philippine Airlines. He is also related to Dingdong Dantes.

Gil finished grade school at the Montessori De Manila in March 2004, a private institute inside the BF Executive Village (Venice Street) in Las Piñas, and secondary school at the Manresa School in Parañaque in March 2008. He went to San Beda College Alabang to pursue a degree in Information Technology, but put his studies on hold to focus on his acting career. In 2016, he started attending a Business Management Program at the Southville International School in BF International, Las Piñas.

Career

2008-2011: Career beginnings
Gil started acting in 2008. He was 16 years old when his mother made him join My Talent summer workshops headed by Trumpets Playshop founder and STAGES president Audie Gemora, to overcome his shyness. They eventually pushed him to audition for Star Magic. Before being introduced to the media as a member of the Star Magic Circle Batch 16, he appeared in a series of TV commercials, including a Lewis and Pearl's advertisement, alongside Coleen Garcia. He landed his first television role in the action-drama series Pieta where he played the character Harold.  Before Pieta, he had a cameo appearance in I Love Betty La Fea as one of the "Eco-models."

In 2009, during the taping of Pieta, his mother convinced him to audition for the sitcom George and Cecil. As soon as head writer and director Jose Javier Reyes saw Gil, he immediately cast him to be on the show. Later he was cast in the indie film Pitas as a brother of the lead character played by Kristel Moreno.

In 2010, he co-starred in the indie war film Diego and His Brothers.  He joined ASAP XV as one of Star Magic's "Gigger Boys" in April, and in May, co-starred in the teleserye Rosalka, in which he played Andrew. He was originally set to appear in Kokey @ Ako, but his character was written off in favor of Jason Francisco. In October, he was given the role of Joco, the younger brother of Paolo Barredo (Gerald Anderson), in the film Till My Heartaches End. He got his first hosting stint in the ABS-CBN teen variety show Shoutout!. This was revamped and renamed to Shoutout!: Level Up, but the show was eventually cancelled due to poor ratings.

In 2011, Gil finally nabbed his first lead role as Michael Miranda — originally played by Diether Ocampo — in the 2011 remake of Mula Sa Puso. He next played Jim in the 10th episode of Your Song Presents: Kim.  The same year, he played Troy Cabrera in Good Vibes. Gil admitted, during the Good Vibes press conference, that he was set to appear in the ABS-CBN's remake of María la del Barrio but had to turn down the role due to conflicting schedules. He replaced Albie Casiño in the Star Cinema film Way Back Home — the film debut of Kathryn Bernardo and Julia Montes.  It was succeeded by his stint as Benjamin “BJ” Maniego in Budoy. He was featured in Zia Quizon's music video debut entitled "Ako Na Lang".

2012-2015: Rising popularity and breakthrough
In 2012, he starred as Dasho Jao Rinpoche in Princess and I, which became one of the most popular shows on ABS-CBN. He was also cast in the film The Reunion, a Filipino teen romantic comedy film directed by Frasco Mortiz. He was included in Amorosa, his first horror film. Later in the year, he appeared in The Strangers, one of the official entries for the 38th Metro Manila Film Festival. This was his first MMFF film.

In February 2013, he was featured in Myrtle Sarrosa's "Mr. Kupido" music video. He also portrayed Senate President Juan Ponce Enrile on Maalaala Mo Kaya. Following this, he appeared in a number of new projects such as Muling Buksan Ang Puso series, alongside Julia Montes and Enchong Dee.

In October 2013, he starred in the film She's The One with Bea Alonzo and Dingdong Dantes, which earned him a Best Supporting Actor nomination in the FAMAS Awards. Many considered this his breakthrough film as an actor. The film earned 12 million pesos on its first day and grossed 135 million pesos on its fifth week.

Gil further gained attention for his dancing skills through his signature moves to the song "Teach Me How to Dougie" and “Gentleman.” He released a debut dance album under Star Records entitled King of the Gil which reached Gold status. Later in the year, Gil held his first headlining sold-out dance concert at the Smart Araneta Coliseum with special guests Angel Locsin, Vice Ganda, Kim Chiu, Kathryn Bernardo, Vhong Navarro, Jhong Hilario, Arron Villaflor, Rayver Cruz, Martin del Rosario, Arjo Atayde, Ejay Falcon, gloc-9, Young JV, G-force, The Streetboys, and Julia Montes. Before proving his dancing prowess in the King of the Gil concert, Gil made his debut on radio drama Dear M.O.R. Special on My Only Radio (MOR) 101.9 For Life! and MOR TV. He portrayed Carlo, a hopeless romantic guy who gives everything to his liberated and dominant girlfriend Lois, played by FM radio's first-ever roving DJ and Darling ng Masa Eva Ronda.

In 2014, he replaced Kiko Estrada in the fantasy series Mirabella — the debut project of Julia Barretto. On February 26, the wattpad author HaveYouSeenThisGirL admitted via Twitter that Gil was really supposed to be in the film adaptation of Diary ng Panget but refused to say why it didn't push through. On March 1, Gil launched his single "Do The Moves" with Sarah Geronimo and apl.de.ap. Its youth-oriented music video was released on March 8. On March 16, Gil confirmed that he would be part of the film The Trial as Martin, the best friend of Ronald (John Lloyd Cruz). On May 18, Gil was named the "Most Promising Male Star of the Year" at the 45th Box Office Entertainment Awards. On June 25, Star Cinema announced that Gil alongside Liza Soberano would lead the film adaptation of Kimberly Joy Villanueva's novel The Bet. On August 21, Gil took part in ABS-CBN Philharmonic Orchestra's debut album Decades of OPM together with Abra, doing their version of "Totoy Bibo."

In October 2014, he played the lead role as the rebellious hotel company heir Alexander "Xander" Grande III, who falls in love with Maria Agnes Calay, played by Soberano in the hit romantic comedy television series Forevermore, which marked a significant turning point in Gil's career. The series finale scored a 39.3 percent rating, the highest recorded national TV rating on Philippine television in 2015.

In June 2015, following the success of Forevermore and his tandem with actress Soberano, they starred in a movie based on the Wattpad book The Bet. The film adaptation, initially titled as the same name as its source material was renamed Just The Way You Are. Later that year, Gil starred in his follow-up movie with Soberano in the romantic film Everyday I Love You with Gerald Anderson, directed by Mae Cruz-Alviar. Gil plays Ethan, who falls in love with Bacolod lass Audrey (Soberano), who is in a relationship with Tristan (Anderson). Both 2015 films were box office successes. On December 1, 2015, Gil received a star at the Philippine Walk of Fame at Eastwood City, Libis, Quezon City.

2016-2019: Subsequent success
In February 2016, Gil and Soberano returned to prime time with the romantic drama Dolce Amore, in which he played the role of Simon Vicente "TenTen" Ibarra, a poor and hardworking Manila boy who will do anything for his family. In July 2016, Gil was the lead actor in the action film Dukot, which was based on a real kidnapping incident in the country. It was helmed by director Paul Soriano and was co-produced by Star Cinema. He won "Best Actor" in Gawad PASADO Awards for his acting performance.

In 2017, Gil starred in the romantic comedy drama film My Ex and Whys opposite Liza Soberano, directed by Cathy Garcia Molina, who had previously worked with them in the romantic comedy television series Forevermore. The film was released in February 2017, grossing ₱31.5 million on its first day and won him the GMMSF Box-Office Entertainment Award for Box Office King. The same year, he took the role Dex in the family comedy-drama film Seven Sundays alongside Aga Muhlach, Ronaldo Valdez, Cristine Reyes, and Dingdong Dantes. Both films made the Top 10 List of highest-grossing Filipino films in 2017.

In 2018, he was cast in the role of Lakas, a warrior in the television drama and fantasy series Bagani. The show debuted at number 1 in its time slot, and consistently ranked ahead of its competition during its five-month run.

In 2019, Gil and Soberano starred in the romantic drama film, Alone/Together, written and directed by Antoinette Jadaone. In the film, Gil played Rafael "Raf" Toledo, a University of Santo Tomas - Biology student and an avid fan of The Eraserheads turned doctor five years later. The film made the Top 10 List of highest-grossing Filipino films in 2019.

2020–present: Recent roles
In 2020, Gil appeared with Soberano in Make It With You as Gabriel "Gabo" Villarica,  a lost soul who finds himself in the small Eastern European country of Croatia. He took a break from acting during the COVID-19 pandemic, but decided to make a return to acting in 2022.

Other ventures

Philanthropy 
In 2013, Gil joined the PETA campaign "Free Mali" to transfer her from the Manila Zoo to Boon Lott's Elephant Sanctuary in Thailand. Mali is the only captive elephant in the Philippines and has been in captivity for the majority of her life, alone, in a tiny enclosure, and in need of proper care. In the same year, Gil donated part of the proceeds of his King of the Gil concert to the victims of Typhoon Haiyan, also known as Super Typhoon Yolanda. In 2015, Gil alongside the cast of Forevermore participated in Hoops for Hope: A Charity Basketball Game, a project organized by the Bakhita Canossa Foundation to sustain the construction of houses for the Yolanda victims at Brgy. But, Salcedo, Eastern Samar. In July 2021, Gil and Soberano held a virtual fan meet to raise funds for Save the Children, a non-profit organization that advocates for children’s rights and provides support for children in need.

Business 
Gil released his own fragrance line in collaboration with the fragrance brand in the Philippines, HKT Fragrances. His debut perfume collection have four scents. The men's line includes BMF and Blaze, while the women's variants are called Meow and Malibu. In an official online launch event held on July 19, 2020 via HKT Productions YouTube Channel, Gil revealed details about how he personally produced and conceptualized the product alongside his sister Diandra Gil. The inspiration came from his father who loves wearing and buying perfumes. Gil said, "I also remember yun lagi yung pasalubong niya for my mom so it's something I grew up with and more than that, I like treating myself. Those little things, treating your senses. People sometimes forget that you got to smell good, and ang daming pabango na ang mamahal. I wanna bring back that in people na you have to smell good and feel good about yourself." Portion of the brand's sales will go to Shop & Share, a non-profit organization which aims to help underprivileged Filipinos get tested for COVID-19.

In February 2021, Gil launched HKT Essentials with Soberano. The alcohol brand was described as having a "baby powder scent and being gentle on the hands even if it is 70 percent ethyl alcohol." Portion of the brand’s sales will go to Save the Children, as well as a relief program for barangay-level health workers.

In January 2022, Gil shared on his Instagram story that he sold one of his house projects in BF Homes Parañaque. This was through his real estate developing business called Gil Side Homes. In an interview with PEP.ph back in December 2019, Gil revealed that he has been into buying and selling of houses with his mother Barbara Anne Bacay.

Personal life
Gil dated his Good Vibes co-star Coleen Garcia from 2010 to 2011.

In February 2019, he and his frequent on-screen partner Liza Soberano publicly confirmed they had been a couple since October 24, 2014. Fans of the couple unofficially named a star after them in 2016.

Filmography

Television

Film

Music video appearances

Discography

Notes
1 Theme song for She's The One2 Together with Sarah Geronimo and Apl.de.ap. The single is for an endorsement. 3 Together with Liza Soberano. The single is for ABS-CBN's 2015 summer station ID. 4 with Liza Soberano, Daniel Padilla, Kathryn Bernardo, James Reid, Nadine Lustre, Bamboo Mañalac, and Elha Nympha

Notes
1 Together with Daniel Padilla and Khalil Ramos 2 Together with Abra 3 Together with Liza Soberano

Awards and nominations

References

External links

1992 births
Star Music artists
Male actors from Cebu
Singers from Cebu City
Filipino people of Spanish descent
Filipino people of German descent
21st-century Filipino male actors
Filipino male models
21st-century Filipino male singers
Filipino male dancers
Bass-baritones
Living people
Filipino male television actors
ABS-CBN personalities
Visayan people
Cebuano people of Spanish descent
Cebuano male models